The Society of Editors is an industry body for around 400 UK national and regional media editors, representatives and organisations. The Society has an elected president, chair and board of directors. The Society was formed by a merger of the Guild of Editors and the Association of the British Editors in April 1999 and its founding executive director was Bob Satchwell, former long-standing editor of the Cambridge News. The Society's current executive director, appointed in July 2021, is Dawn Alford. 

The Society has a history of campaigning on behalf of freedom of expression in the UK and beyond. And in 2019, it celebrated 20 years of campaigning in the name of a free press, freedom of speech and the public's right to know. The aim of the Society is to safeguard the universal right to freedom of expression, to advocate the importance of an active and trusted news media in a democratic society, to guard the public's right to know, protect press and broadcasting freedom, encourage diversity and inclusion across all sectors of the media and to promote high editorial standards. 

The Society's annual high-profile media conferences have hosted government ministers and industry representatives from across the national, regional, broadcast, digital and online media and its National and Regional Press Awards ceremonies have long-championed the quality journalism produced by national and regional journalists across the UK.

The Society strives to serve its members and the wider industry through lobbying, campaigning and facilitating professional development through events and activities that meet the changing needs of the news media industry in the UK. In 2022, the Society of Editors launched its diversity, inclusion and belonging hub which highlights good practices and shares practical initiatives that promote diversity and inclusion in journalism.

Response to Oprah with Meghan and Harry 
On 10 March 2021, Ian Murray, the executive editor of the group, was interviewed by Victoria Derbyshire on BBC News. Contradicting claims made by Prince Harry during Oprah with Meghan and Harry, Murray said, "the UK media is not bigoted and will not be swayed from its vital role holding the rich and powerful to account". In response to this, several news organisations withdrew from the society's Press Awards, as did ITV presenter Charlene White, who was due to host the event. Over 160 journalists also issued statements, disagreeing with Murray's claims. Murray resigned the following day. The Bureau of Investigative Journalism stated the society's "statement denying bigotry and racism in the UK media shows a lack of awareness and understanding of deep-rooted and persistent problems that we see".

References 

Meghan, Duchess of Sussex
Oprah Winfrey
Prince Harry, Duke of Sussex
News media in the United Kingdom
Professional associations based in the United Kingdom